Rebbetzin Leila Leah Bronner (née Amsel; April 22, 1930 – July 2, 2019) was an American historian and biblical scholar.

Biography
She was born in Czechoslovakia and immigrated to the United States in 1937, growing up in Williamsburg, Brooklyn.

In 1949, she married Rabbi Joseph Bronner (born August 1, 1923), who had escaped Berlin with his family in 1941. They moved with their newborn daughter to Johannesburg, South Africa in 1951, where she began her career. She taught at the University of the Witwatersrand and she co-founded the Yeshiva College of South Africa. In 1984, the family moved to Los Angeles, California where Leila Bronner taught at  American Jewish University and the University of Southern California. She became president of Emunah Women, and was involved in Amit Women, Builders of Jewish Education, and the Jewish Federation.

She authored four books, including two books about biblical women, in which she showed that they are represented in many different ways, and another book about the afterlife, in which she tackled both Hassidic and Kabbalistic approaches.

Leila Leah Bronner died on July 2, 2019 in Los Angeles, aged 89, She was survived by her husband, three children, and extended family.

Selected works

References

1930 births
2019 deaths
People from Williamsburg, Brooklyn
University of the Witwatersrand alumni
University of Pretoria alumni
Academic staff of the University of the Witwatersrand
University of Southern California faculty
Jewish American historians
American expatriates in South Africa
American Jewish University faculty
American biblical scholars
American people of Czech-Jewish descent
American people of Slovak-Jewish descent
20th-century American women writers
21st-century American women writers
American women academics
Historians from New York (state)
Historians from California
21st-century American Jews